Jansen Panettiere (September 25, 1994 – February 19, 2023) was an American actor. He was known for his roles in films The Secrets of Jonathan Sperry, The Perfect Game, Ice Age: The Meltdown, The Martial Arts Kid, and How High 2. His elder sister is actress Hayden Panettiere.

Early life
Panettiere was born in Palisades, New York, to Lesley R. Vogel, a former soap opera actress, and Alan Lee "Skip" Panettiere, a fire department lieutenant.

Career
Jansen had a supporting role in the Disney Channel Original Movie Tiger Cruise, which starred his sister Hayden (this is one of only two productions in which both siblings featured onscreen, the other being The Forger – Jansen lent his voice to Racing Stripes, in which Hayden appeared). He portrayed the voice of Truman X in The X's. He starred as Lucas Malloy in the made-for-television Nickelodeon film The Last Day of Summer, which first showed July 20, 2007. It was released on DVD on August 28, 2007.

His next film, The Perfect Game, was going to be released in theaters on August 8, 2008, but Lionsgate Films decided to push it back to the spring of 2010. The Perfect Game is directed by William Dear, based on the true story of how a group of boys from Monterrey, Mexico become the first non-U.S. team to win the Little League World Series. Panettiere also co-stars with Gavin MacLeod in The Secrets of Jonathan Sperry, a film directed by Rich Christiano about faith and friendship.  He appeared with Martin Sheen, Jamie Lee Curtis, and Christine Lahti, as Elliott Perry in Dustin Lance Black's play 8, a reenactment of the Perry v. Schwarzenegger trial, at the Wilshire Ebell Theatre on March 3, 2012. The performance was broadcast on YouTube to raise money for the American Foundation for Equal Rights.
In 2019, Jansen guest starred in the AMC network series The Walking Dead and co-starred in MTV's How High 2.

Death
Panettiere unexpectedly died of cardiomegaly (enlarged heart) with aortic valve complications on February 19, 2023, at the age of 28. He was found unresponsive sitting upwards in a chair by a friend who performed Cardiopulmonary resuscitation (CPR) and eventually called 911. He was pronounced dead shortly thereafter. According to his father Alan, Jansen had "sounded okay" when the two spoke with each other the prior evening.

Filmography

References

External links
 
 

1994 births
2023 deaths
21st-century American male actors
American male child actors
American male film actors
American male soap opera actors
American male television actors
American male voice actors
American people of Italian descent
Deaths from heart disease
Male actors from New York (state)
People from Palisades, New York